Kasisit is a settlement in Kenya's Baringo County.It is majorly inhabited by Tugen people a subtribe of Kalenjins.It is located on the Hills of KABARTONJO Division.

References 

Populated places in Baringo County